Éric Vigne is a French writer and editor for Éditions Gallimard. He is known as a historiographical critic.

Works
Le livre et l'éditeur, 2008

References

Living people
Year of birth missing (living people)
French male writers